Ronald W. Schafer (born February 17, 1938) is an electrical engineer notable for his contributions to digital signal processing.

After receiving his Ph.D. degree at Massachusetts Institute of Technology in 1968, he joined the Acoustics Research Department at Bell Laboratories, where he did research on digital signal processing and digital speech coding. In 1974 he joined the Georgia Institute of Technology, where he became a professor in electrical engineering, until leaving to join Hewlett Packard in March 2005.

He has served as associate editor of IEEE Transactions on Acoustics, Speech, and Signal Processing and as vice-president and president of the IEEE Signal Processing Society. He is a Life Fellow of the IEEE and a Fellow of the Acoustical Society of America. He is also a member of the National Academy of Engineering in 1994 for research, teaching, and leadership in signal processing.

He has received the IEEE Region 3 Outstanding Engineer Award, the 1980 IEEE Emanuel R. Piore Award, the Distinguished Professor Award at the Georgia Institute of Technology, the 1992 IEEE Education Medal and the 2010 IEEE Jack S. Kilby Signal Processing Medal.

Books 
 Digital Signal Processing, A. V. Oppenheim, R. W. Schafer, Prentice Hall, 1975
 Digital Processing of Speech Signals, L. Rabiner, R. W. Schafer, Pearson Education, 1978.
 Discrete-Time Signal Processing, A. V. Oppenheim, R. W. Schafer, Prentice Hall, 1989.
 Computer-Based Exercises for Signal Processing Using MATLAB, J. H. McClellan, C. S. Burrus, A. V. Oppenheim, T. W. Parks, R. W. Schafer, H. W. Schuessler, Prentice Hall, 1998
 DSP First: A Multimedia Approach J. H. McClellan, R. W. Schafer, M. A. Yoder, Upper Saddle River, NJ: Prentice-Hall, Inc., 1998.
 Signal Processing First J. H. McClellan, R. W. Schafer, M. A. Yoder, Upper Saddle River, NJ: Prentice-Hall, Inc., 2003.

References

External links 
 Hewlett-Packard press release on HP Fellow Ronald Schafer
 Publications from Google Scholar

1938 births
Living people
American electrical engineers
Fellow Members of the IEEE
MIT School of Humanities, Arts, and Social Sciences alumni
Georgia Tech faculty
Scientists at Bell Labs
Members of the United States National Academy of Engineering
Fellows of the Acoustical Society of America
Speech processing researchers
People from Tecumseh, Nebraska